Class B: Philosophy, Psychology, Religion is a classification used by the Library of Congress Classification system. This article outlines the subclasses of Class B.

B - Philosophy (General)
69-99..........General works
108-5802.......By period (including individual philosophers and schools of philosophy)
108-708.......Ancient
720-765.......Medieval
770-785.......Renaissance
790-5802......Modern
808-849........Special topics and schools of philosophy
850-5739.......By region or country
5800-5802......By religion

BC - Logic
11-39......History
25-39.....By Period
60-99......General works
171-199....Special topics

BD - Speculative philosophy
10-41..........General philosophical works
95-131.........Metaphysics
143-237........Epistemology. Theory of knowledge
240-260........Methodology
300-450........Ontology (including being, the soul, life, death)
493-701........Cosmology (including teleology, space and time, structure of matter, plurality of worlds)

BF - Psychology
1-990.......Psychology
38-64..........Philosophy, Relation to other topics
173-175.5......Psychoanalysis
176-176.5......Psychological tests and testing
180-198.7......Experimental psychology
203............Gestalt psychology
207-209........Psychotropic drugs and other substances
231-299........Sensation, Aesthesiology
309-499........Consciousness, Cognition (including learning, attention, comprehension, memory, imagination, genius, intelligence, thought and thinking, psycholinguistics, mental fatigue)
501-505........Motivation
511-593........Affection, Feeling, Emotion
608-635........Will, Volition, Choice, Control
636-637........Applied psychology
638-648........New Thought, Menticulture, etc.
660-685........Comparative psychology, Animal and human psychology
692-692.5......Psychology of sex, Sexual behavior
697-697.5......Differential psychology. Individuality. Self
698-698.9......Personality
699-711........Genetic psychology
712-724.85.....Developmental psychology (including infant psychology, child psychology, adolescence, adulthood)
795-839........Temperament. Character
839.8-885......Physiognomy. Phrenology
889-905........Graphology. Study of handwriting
908-940........The hand. Palmistry
1001-1389.......Parapsychology
1001-1045......Psychic research. Psychology of the conscious
1048-1108......Hallucinations. Sleep. Dreaming. Visions.
1111-1156......Hypnotism. Suggestion. Mesmerism. Subliminal projection
1161-1171......Telepathy. Mind reading. Thought transference
1228-1389......Spiritualism (including mediumship, spirit messages, clairvoyance)
1404-2055.......Occult sciences
1444-1486......Ghosts. Apparitions. Hauntings
1501-1562......Demonology. Satanism. Possession
1562.5-1584....Witchcraft
1585-1623......Magic. Hermetics. Necromancy
1651-1729......Astrology
1745-1779......Oracles. Sibyls. Divinations
1783-1815......Seers. Prophets. Prophecies
1845-1891......Fortune-telling
2050-2055......Human-alien encounters. Contact between humans and extraterrestrials.

BH - Aesthetics
81-208.....History
301........Special topics

BJ - Ethics
1-1725........Ethics
71-1185.........History and general works. (Including individual ethical philosophers.)
1188-1295.......Religious ethics
1298-1335.......Evolutionary and genetic ethics
1365-1385.......Positivist ethics
1388............Socialist ethics
1390-1390.5.....Communist ethics
1392............Totalitarian ethics
1395............Feminist ethics
1518-1697.......Individual ethics. Character. Virtue. (Including practical and applied ethics, conduct of life, vices, success, ethics for children.)
1725............Ethics of social groups, classes, etc. Professional ethics.
1801-2195......Social usages. Etiquette.
2021-2078.......Etiquette of entertaining
2139-2156.......Etiquette of travel
2195............Telephone etiquette

BL - Religions. Mythology. Rationalism
1-50...................Religion (General)
51-65..................Philosophy of religion. Psychology of religion. Religion in relation to other subjects.
70-71..................Sacred books (General)
71.5-73................Biography
74-99..................Religions of the world.
175-265................Natural Theology
175-190...............General
200...................Theism
205-216...............Nature and attributes of Deity
217...................Polytheism
218...................Dualism
220...................Pantheism
221...................Monotheism
224-227...............Creation. Theory of the earth.
239-265...............Religion and science
270....................Unity and plurality
290....................The soul
300-325................The myth. Comparative mythology
350-385................Classification of religions
410....................Religions in relation to one another
425-490................Religious doctrines (General)
430...................Origins of religion
435-457...............Nature worship
458...................Women in comparative religion
460...................Sex worship. Phallicism.
465-470...............Worship of human beings
473-490...............Other
500-547................Eschatology
550-619................Worship. Cultus.
624-629.5..............Religious life.
630-(632.5)............Religious organization
660-2680...............History and principles of religions
660...................Indo-European. Aryan.
685...................Ural-Altaic.
687...................Mediterranean region.
689-980...............European. Occidental
700-820..............Classical (Etruscan, Greek, Roman)
830-875..............Germanic and Norse
900-980..............Other European
1000-2370.............Asian. Oriental
1000-1035............General
1050-1060............By region
1100-1295............Hinduism
1100-1107.5.........General
1108.2-1108.7.......Religious education
1109.2-1109.7.......Antiquities. Archaeology. Inscriptions
1111-1143.2.........Sacred books. Sources
1112.2-1137.5......Vedic texts
1140.2-1140.4......Purānas
1141.2-1142.6......Tantric texts
1145-1146...........Hindu literature
1153.7-1168.........By region or country
1212.32-1215........Doctrines. Theology
1216-1225...........Hindu pantheon. Deities
1225.2-1243.58......Religious life
1243.72-1243.78.....Monasteries. Temples, etc.
1271.2-1295.........Modifications. Sects
1284.5-1289.592....Vaishnavism
1300-1380............Jainism
1310-1314.2.........Sacred books. Sources
1315-1317...........Jain literature
1375.3-1375.7.......Jain pantheon. Deities
1376-1378.85........Forms of worship
1379-1380...........Modifications, etc.
1500-1590............Zoroastrianism (Mazdeism). Parseeism
1595.................Yezidis
1600-1695............Semitic religions
1600-1605...........General
1610................Aramean
1615-1616...........Sumerian
1620-1625...........Assyro-Babylonian
1630................Chaldean
1635................Harranian. Pseudo-Sabian
1640-1645...........Syrian. Palestinian. Samaritan
1650................Hebrew. (For Judaism, see subclass BM)
1660-1665...........Phoenician. Carthaginian, etc.
1670-1672...........Canaanite
1675................Moabite. Philistine
1680-1685...........Arabian (except Islam)
1695................Druses
1710.................Ethiopian
1750-2350............By region or country
1790-1975...........China
1830-1883..........Confucianism
1899-1942.85.......Taoism
2000-2032...........India
2017-2018.7........Sikhism
2195-2228...........Japan
2216-2227.8........Shinto
2230-2240...........Korea
2390-2490.............African
2420-2460............Egyptian
2500-2592.............American. (For American Indians, see class E and class F)
2600-2630.............Pacific Ocean Islands. Oceania
2670..................Arctic regions
2700-2790..............Rationalism

BM - Judaism
1-449..........General
70-135..........Study and teaching
150-449..........History
201-449..........By region or country
480-488.8..........Pre-Talmudic Jewish literature (non-Biblical)
495-532............Sources of Jewish religion. Rabbinical literature
497-509..........Talmudic literature
497-497.8..........Mishnah
498-498.8..........Palestinian Talmud
499-504.7..........Babylonian Talmud
507-507.5..........Baraita
508-508.5..........Tosefta
510-518..........Midrash
520-523.7..........Halacha
525-526..........Cabala
529..........Jewish tradition
534-538..........Relation of Judaism to special subject fields
534-536..........Religions
545-582..........Principles of Judaism (General)
585-585.4..........Controversial works against the Jews
590-591..........Jewish works against Christianity and Islam
600-645..........Dogmatic Judaism
646..........Heresy, heresies
648..........Apologetics
650-747..........Practical Judaism
651-652.7..........Priests, rabbis, etc.
653-653.7..........Congregations. Synagogues
654-655.6..........The tabernacle. The temple
656-657..........Forms of worship
660-679..........Liturgy and ritual
690-695..........Festivals and fasts
700-720..........Rites and customs
723-729..........Jewish way of life. Spiritual life. Mysticism. Personal religion. Moral theology
730-747..........Preaching. Homiletics
750-755..........Biography
900-990..........Samaritans

BP - Islam. Baháʼí Faith. Theosophy
1-253......Islam
1-68.......General
42-48......Study and teaching
60-68......History
70-80......Biography
75-77.75.......................Muhammad, Prophet
87-89......Islamic literature
100-157..Sacred books
100-134......Quran
128.15-129.83...... Special parts and chapters
130-134..................Works about the Quran
135-136.9....Hadith literature. Traditions. Sunna
137-136.9....Koranic and other Islamic legends
160-165.......General works on Islam
165.5...........Dogma (ʻAqā̓id)
166-166.94..Theology (Kalām)
167.5............Heresy, heresies, heretics
168................Apostasy from Islam
169.................Works against Islam and the Koran
170................Works in defense of Islam. Islamic apologetics
170.2.........Benevolent work. Social work. Welfare work, etc...
170.3-170.5..Missionary work of Islam
171-173.........Relation of Islam to other religions
173.25-173.45..Islamic sociology
174-190............The practice of Islam
176-181..........The five duties of a Muslim. Five Pillars of Islam.
182..................Jihad (Holy war)
184-184.9........Religious ceremonies, rites, etc...
186-186.97......Special days and seasons, fasts, feasts, festival, etc. Relics
187-187.9........Shrines, sacred places, etc.
188-190...........Islamic religious life
188.2-188.3........Devotional literature
188.45-189.65.....Sufism. Mysticism. Dervishes
189.68-189.7.......Monasticism
191-253...........Branches, sects, etc
192-194.9.......Shiites
221-223...........Black muslims
232...................Moorish Science Temple of America
251-253............Nurculuk
 300-395.....Bahai  Faith
 500-585.....Theosophy
 595-597......Anthroposophy
 600-610......Other beliefs and movements

BQ - Buddhism
1-10..........Periodicals. Yearbooks (General)
12-93..........Societies, councils, associations, clubs, etc.
96-99..........Financial institutions. Trusts
100-102..........Congresses. Conferences (General)
104-105..........Directories (General)
107-109..........Museums. Exhibitions
115-126..........General collections. Collected works
128..........Encyclopedias (General)
130..........Dictionaries (General)
133..........Terminology
135..........Questions and answers. Maxims (General)
141-209..........Religious education (General)
210-219..........Research
221-249..........Antiquities. Archaeology
240-244..........Literary discoveries
246-249..........Inscriptions, etc.
251-799..........History
800-829..........Persecutions
840-999..........Biography
840-858..........Collective
860-999..........Individual
860-939..........Gautama Buddha
940-999..........Other
1001-1045..........Buddhist literature
1100-3340..........Tripitaka (Canonical literature)
4000-4060..........General works
4061-4570..........Doctrinal and systematic Buddhism
4180-4565..........Special doctrines
4570..........Special topics and relations to special subjects
4600-4610..........Relation to other religious and philosophical systems
4620-4905..........Buddhist Pantheon
4911-5720..........Practice of Buddhism. Forms of worship
4965-5030..........Ceremonies and rites. Ceremonial rules
5035-5065..........Hymns. Chants. Recitations
5070-5075..........Altar, liturgical objects, ornaments, memorials, etc.
5080-5085..........Vestments, altar cloths, etc.
5090-5095..........Liturgical functions
5100-5125..........Symbols and symbolism
5130-5137..........Temple. Temple organization
5140-5355..........Buddhist ministry. Priesthood. Organization
5251-5305..........Education and training
5310-5350..........Preaching
5360-5680..........Religious life
5485-5530..........Precepts for laymen
5535-5594..........Devotional literature. Meditations. Prayers
5595-5633..........Devotion. Meditation. Prayer
5635-5675..........Spiritual life. Mysticism. Englightenment. Perfection
5700-5720..........Festivals. Days and seasons
5725-5845..........Folklore
5821-5845..........Miracle literature
5851-5899..........Benevolent work. Social work. Welfare work, etc.
5901-5975..........Missionary work
6001-6160..........Monasticism and monastic life Samgha (Order)
6200-6240..........Asceticism. Hermits. Wayfaring life
6300-6388..........Monasteries. Temples. Shrines. Sites
6400-6495..........Pilgrims and pilgrimages
7001-9800..........Modifications, schools, etc.
7100-7285..........Theravāda (Hinayana) Buddhism
7300-7529..........Mahayana Buddhism
7530-7950..........Tibetan Buddhism (Lamaism)
7960-7989..........Bonpo (Sect)
8000-9800..........Special modifications, sects, etc.
8500-8769..........Pure Land Buddhism
8900-9099..........Tantric Buddhism
9250-9519..........Zen Buddhism

BR - Christianity
60-67..........Early Christian literature. Fathers of the Church, etc.
115..........Christianity in relation to special subjects
130-133.5..........Christian antiquities. Archaeology. Museums
140-1510..........History of Christianity
160-481..........By period
160-275..........Early and medieval
280..........Renaissance. Renaissance and Reformation
290-481..........Modern period
323.5-334.2..........Martin Luther
500-1510..........By region or country
1600-1609..........Persecution. Martyrs
1609.5..........Dissent
1610..........Tolerance and toleration
1615-1617..........Liberalism
1620..........Sacrilege (History)
1690-1725..........Biography

BS - The Bible
11-115 Early versions
125-355 Modern texts and versions
125-198 English
199-313 Other European languages
315-355  Non
325 African languages
335 Languages of Oceania and Australasia
345 American Indian languages
350 Mixed languages
355 Artificial languages
410-680 Works about the Bible
500-534.8 Criticism and interpretation
535-537 The Bible as literature
546-558 Bible stories. Paraphrases of Bible stories. The Bible story
569-580 Men, women, and children of the Bible
580 Individual Old Testament characters
585-613 Study and teaching
647-649 Prophecy
650-667 Bible and science
670-672 Bible and social sciences
701-1830 Old Testament
705-815 Early versions
825-1013 Modern texts and versions
1091-1099 Selections. Quotations
1110-1199 Works about the Old Testament
1160-1191.5 Criticism and interpretation
1200-1830 Special parts of the Old Testament
1901-2970 New Testament
1937-2020 Early texts and versions
2025-2213 Modern texts and versions
2260-2269 Selections. Quotations
2280-2545 Works about the New Testament
2350-2393 Criticism and interpretation
2415-2417 The teachings of Jesus
2430-2520 Men, women, and children of the New Testament
2525-2544 Study and teaching
2547-2970 Special parts of the New Testament
2640-2765.6 Epistles of Paul

BT - Doctrinal Theology
19-37 Doctrine and dogma
93-93.6 Judaism
95-97.2 Divine law. Moral government
98-180 God
109-115 Doctrine of the Trinity
117-123 Holy Spirit. The Paraclete
126-127.5 Revelation
130-153 Divine attributes
198-590 Christology
296-500 Life of Christ
580 Miracles. Apparitions. Shrines, sanctuaries, images, processions, etc.
587 Relics
595-680  Mary, Mother of Jesus Christ. Mariology
650-660 Miracles. Apparitions. Shrines, sanctuaries, images, processions, etc.
695-749  Creation
750-811 Salvation. Soteriology
819-891 Eschatology. Last things
899-940 Future state.  Future life
960-985 Invisible world (saints, demons, etc.)
990-1010 Creeds, confessions, covenants, etc.
1029-1040 Catechisms
1095-1255 Apologetics. Evidences of Christianity
1313-1480  History of specific doctrines and movements. Heresies and schisms

BV - Practical Theology
5-530 Worship (Public and private)
30-135 Times and seasons.  The Church year
43-64  Feast days
65-70  Saints’ days
80-105  Fasts
107-133 Lord’s Day. Sunday. Sabbath
150-168 Christian symbols and  symbolism
169-199 Liturgy and ritual
200 Family worship
205-287 Prayer
301-530 Hymnology
360-465 Denominational and special types of hymnbooks in English
467-510 Hymns in languages other than English
590-1652  Ecclesiastical theology
598-603 The Church
629-631 Church and state
637-637.5 City churches
638-638.8 The rural church. The church and country life
646-651 Church polity
652-652.9 Church management. Efficiency
652.95-657 Mass media and telecommunication in religion
659-683 Ministry. Clergy. Religious vocations
700-707 Parish. Congregation. The local church
770-777 Church finance. Church property
800-873 Sacraments. Ordinances
803-814 Baptism
823-828 Holy Communion. Lord's Supper. Eucharist
835-838 Marriage
840-850 Penance
895-896 Shrines. Holy places
900-1450 Religious societies, associations, etc.
950-1280 Religious societies of men, brotherhoods, etc.
1000-1220  Young Men’s Christian Associations
1300-1395 Religious societies of women
1300-1393  Young Women’s Christian Associations
1460-1615 Religious education (General)
1620-1652 Social life, recreation, etc., in the church
2000-3705  Missions
2123-2595 Special churches
2130-2300 Roman Catholic Church
2350-2595  Protestant churches
2610-2695 Special types of missions
2750-3695 Missions in individual countries
3750-3799 Evangelism.  Revivals
4000-4470 Pastoral theology
4019-4180  Education
4019-4167 Training for the ordained ministry
4168-4180 Training for lay workers
4200-4317 Preaching. Homiletics
4239-4317 Sermons
4390-4399 Personal life of the clergy
4400-4470 Practical church work. Social work. Work of the layman
4485-5099 Practical religion. The Christian life
4520-4526.2 Religious duties
4625-4780 Moral theology
4625-4627 Sins and vices
4630-4647 Virtues
4650-4715 Precepts from the Bible
4720-4780 Precepts of the Church. Commandments of the Church
4800-4897 Works of meditation and devotion
4900-4911 Works of consolation and cheer
4912-4950  Conversion literature
5015-5068 Asceticism
5070-5095 Mysticism
5099  Quietism

BX - Christian Denominations
1-9.5 Church unity.  Ecumenical movement. Interdenominational cooperation
100-189  Eastern churches.  Oriental churches
100-107 General
120-129 Armenian Church
130-139 Coptic Church
140-149 Ethiopic or Abyssinian Church
150-159 Nestorian, Chaldean, or East Syrian Church
160-169  St. Thomas Christians. Malabar Christians.  Mar Thoma Syrian Church
170-179 Syrian or Jacobite Church
180-189 Maronite Church
200-756  Orthodox Eastern Church
200-395 General
400-756 Divisions of the church
400-440 Patriarchates of the East.  Melchites
450-450.93 Church of Cyprus
460-605 Russian Church
610-620 Church of Greece
630-639 Orthodox Church in  Austria and  Hungary
650-659 Bulgarian Church
660-669  Georgian Church
670-679 Montenegrin Church
690-699 Romanian Church
710-719  Serbian Church. Yugoslav Church
720-729 Orthodox Eastern Church,  Macedonian
729.5 Orthodox Eastern Church,  Ukrainian
729.9-755 Orthodox Church in other regions or countries
800-4795 Catholic Church
800-839 Periodicals. Societies,  councils, congresses, etc.
840 Museums. Exhibitions
841 Dictionaries.  Encyclopedias
845 Directories. Yearbooks
847 Atlases
850-875 Documents
880-891 General collected works
895-939 Study and teaching
940-1745 History. Including lives of popes
1746-1755  Theology. Doctrine. Dogmatics
1756 Sermons
1760-1779.5 Controversial works
1781-1788 Catholic Church and other churches
1790-1793 Catholic Church and the state
1800-1920 Government and organization
1958-1968 Creeds and catechisms
1969 Forms of worship. Catholic practice
1970-2175 Liturgy and ritual
2050-2175 Prayers and devotions
2177-2198 Meditations. Devotional readings. Spiritual exercises, etc.
2200-2292 Sacraments
2295-2310 Sacramentals
2312 Images
2315-2324 Relics. Shrines. Pilgrimages. Processions
2325-2333 Saints.  Hagiology
2347-2377 Practical religion. Christian life
2380-2386 Religious life. Religious state
2400-4563 Monasticism. Religious orders
2890-4192 Religious orders of men
4200-4563 Religious orders of women
4600-4644 Churches, cathedrals, abbeys (as parish churches), etc.
4650-4705 Biography and portraits
4650-4698 Collective
4654-4662 Saints and martyrs
4700-4705 Individual
4700 Saints
4710.1-4715.95 Eastern churches in communion with Rome. Catholics of the Oriental rites. Uniats
4716.4-4795 Dissenting sects other than Protestant
4718.5-4735 Jansenists
4737 French schisms of the 19th century
4740 German Catholics
4751-4793  Old Catholics
4793.5-4794.25 Independent Catholic Churches
4795 Other
4800-9999 Protestantism
4800-4861 General
4872-4924 Pre-Reformation
4872-4893  Waldenses and  Albigenses
4900-4906  Lollards.  Wycliffites
4913-4924 Hussites
4920-4924  Bohemian Brethren
4929-4951 Post-Reformation
4929-4946 Anabaptists
4950-4951 Plain People
5001-5009 Anglican Communion (General)
5011-5207 Church of England
5011-5050 General
5051-5110  History. Local divisions
5115-5126 Special parties and movements
5127-5129.8 Church of England and other churches
5130-5132 General
5133 Sermons. Tracts. Addresses. Essays
5135-5136 Controversial works
5137-5139  Creeds and catechisms, etc.
5140.5-5147  Liturgy and ritual
5148-5149  Sacraments
5150-5182.5 Government.  Organization. Discipline
5183-5187  Religious communities. Conventual life. Religious societies
5194-5195 Cathedrals, churches, etc. in England and Wales
5197-5199 Biography
5200-5207 Dissent and  nonconformity
5210-5395  Episcopal Church in Scotland
5410-5595 Church of Ireland
5596-5598 Church in Wales
5600-5740 Church of England outside of Great Britain
5601-5620 Anglican Church of Canada
5800-5995  Protestant Episcopal Church in the United States of America
5996-6030 Protestant Episcopal Church outside the United States
6051-6093 Reformed Episcopal Church
6101-9999 Other Protestant denominations (Alphabetical; only larger denominations listed. The subarrangement is essentially the same for each sect, the primary features being indicated by way of example under Baptists)
6101-6193  Adventists.  “Millerites”
6195-6197  Arminians. Remonstrants
6201-6495 Baptists
6201-6227 General
6231-6328 History. By region or country
6329 Baptists relations with other churches
6330-6331 Doctrine
6332 Addresses, essays, lectures
6333 Sermons. Tracts
6334 Controversial works
6335-6336 Creeds. Catechisms
6337 Service. Ritual. Liturgy
6338-6339 Sacraments
6340-6346.3 Government. Discipline
6349-6470 Individual branches
6480-6490 Individual Baptist churches
6493-6495 Biography
6551-6593 Catholic Apostolic Church. Irvingites
6651-6693 Christadelphians. Brothers of Christ
6751-6793 Christian Church
6801-6843 Christian Reformed Church
6901-6997 Christian Science
7003 Christian Union
7020-7060 Church of God
7079-7097 Churches of God
7101-7260 Congregationalism
7301-7343  Disciples of Christ. Campbellites
7401-7430  Dowieism.  Christian Catholic Church
7451-7493 Evangelical and Reformed Church
7556 Evangelical United Brethren Church
7580-7583  Free Congregations (Germany). Freie Gemeinden
7601-7795 Friends. Society of Friends. Quakers
7801-7843  German Baptist Brethren. Church of the Brethren.  Dunkards
7850-7865 German Evangelical Protestant Church of North America. Evangelical Protestant Church of North America
7901-7943  German Evangelical Synod of North America
7990.H6-.H69  Holiness churches
8001-8080  Lutheran churches
8101-8144 Mennonites
8201-8495 Methodism
8525-8528  Millennial Dawnists. Jehovah’s Witnesses
8551-8593 Moravian Church. United Brethren. Unitas Fratrum. Herrnhuters
8601-8695 Mormons. The Church of Jesus Christ of Latter-day Saints
8601–8610 General
8611–8617 History
8621–8631 Sources. Sacred Books
8635–8638 General treatises. Doctrines
8639 Sermons. Tracts
8641–8643 Special topics
8645 Controversial works against the Mormons
8647 Relation to other churches
8651 Liturgy and ritual
8655 Sacraments
8656 Spiritual life
8657 Government and discipline
8659 Priesthood
8661 Missions
8670–8680 Individual branches or sects
8670–8678 Community of Christ. Reorganized Church of Jesus Christ of Latter-Day Saints
8680 Other
8685–8687 Temples
8693–8695 Biography
8697 Muckers (Ebelians)
8698 Muggletonians
8699.M8 Mukyokaishugi Shūkai. "Non-Churchism Assembly"
8699.N3-.N38 Church of the Nazarene. Pentecostal Church of the Nazarene
8699.N4 Nazarenes (Wirz)
8699.N5 New Apostolic Church
8701-8749 New Jerusalem Church.  New Church. Swedenborgianism
8762-8785  Pentecostal churches
8799-8809 Plymouth Brethren.  Darbyites
8901-9225 Presbyterianism.  Calvinistic Methodism
9301-9359 Puritanism
9401-9640 Reformed or  Calvinistic Churches
9675 River Brethren.  Brethren in Christ
9701-9743 Salvation Army
9751-9793 Shakers. United Society of Believers. Millennial Church
9801-9869 Unitarianism
9875-9877.1 United Brethren in Christ. Church of the United Brethren in Christ
9881-9882.95 United Church of Canada
9884-9886 United Church of Christ
9887 United Evangelical Church
9889  United Missionary Church
9901-9969 Universalism. Universalists
9975 Volunteers of America
9980 Walloon Church
9998 Other beliefs and movements akin to Christianity
9999 Independent churches, parishes, societies, etc.

References

Further reading 

 Full schedule of all LCC Classifications

B